WNAP-LP (107.5 FM) is a low-power radio station at 107.5 MHz with 100 watts of power in Muncie, Indiana.

It was formed as an FM simulcast with the former WLHN 990 kHz (currently WNAP), also located in Muncie. The station first signed on in 2005 as WJPB-LP.

WNAP-LP airs a oldies format as a simulcast of WNAP-FM (and its translators in Muncie and Edinburgh), WNAP, and Cole, Indiana based WNPP and is owned and operated by New Beginnings Movement.

External links
 

NAP-LP
NAP-LP
Radio stations established in 2005
2005 establishments in Indiana